Les Gaz mortels is a 1916 silent French film directed by Abel Gance.

Cast
 Doriani
 Émile Keppens
 Henri Maillard
 Léon Mathot
 Germaine Pelisse
 Maud Richard
 Jean Fleury

References

External links

1916 films
1910s French-language films
French silent feature films
French black-and-white films
Films directed by Abel Gance
1910s French films